This article records new taxa of fossil mammals of every kind that are scheduled to be described during the year 2023, as well as other significant discoveries and events related to paleontology of mammals that are scheduled to occur in the year 2023.

Afrotherians

Proboscideans

Proboscidean research
 Revision of the gomphothere faunas of the Miocene Linxia Basin (China) is published by Wang et al. (2023), who report the presence of three fossil assemblages of different age.
 A study on the accumulation of woolly mammoth bones from the Upper Paleolithic site Kostenki 14 (Markina Gora, Voronezh Oblast, Russia), aiming to assess relations between the body size of Kostenki mammoths, the state of their population and the timeframe of bone assemblage accumulation, is published by Petrova et al. (2023), who interpret their findings as indicative of relatively long-term inhabitation of the studied area by mammoths and permanent visitation of the site.
 Evidence from tooth enamel of a woolly mammoth from the Upper Paleolithic Kraków Spadzista site (Poland), interpreted as indicating that the studied mammoth grazed in southern Poland in winter time and likely moved 250–400 km northwards during summer throughout at least 12–13 years of its adult life, is presented by Kowalik et al. (2023).

Sirenians

Sirenian research

Other afrotherians

Miscellaneous afrotherian research

Euarchontoglires

Primates

Primate research
 Kikuchi (2023) attempts to determine the body mass of Nacholapithecus kerioi, and considers it to be an arboreal primate.
 Review of the Miocene ape systematics is published by Urciuoli & Alba (2023), who discuss the problems affecting the studies of phylogenetic relationships and evolutionary history of Miocene apes.
 A study aiming to determine absolute crown strength and bite force of the lower postcanine teeth of Gigantopithecus blacki is published by Yi et al. (2023), who report evidence of dental specialization which might represent an adaptation to processing mechanically challenging foods.
 A study on the distinctiveness of Miocene dryopithecines from the Iberian Peninsula is published by Zanolli et al. (2023), who argue that teeth of Pierolapithecus, Anoiapithecus, Dryopithecus and Hispanopithecus show morphological differences consistent with their attribution to different genera.
 A study comparing the dietary strategies of Pleistocene orangutans and Homo erectus from Sangiran (Java, Indonesia) is published by Kubat et al. (2023), who interpret their findings as indicating that H. erectus exploited varied food sources and was less dependent on variations in seasonal food availability than orangutans.

General paleoanthropology
 Hatala, Gatesy & Falkingham (2023) find that longitudinally arched footprints are not necessarily indicating that the hominins which produced them had longitudinally arched feet, but rather that such footprints are created through a pattern of foot kinematics that is characteristic of human walking; the authors consider Pleistocene tracks from Ileret (Kenya) to be the earliest known evidence for fully modern human-like bipedal kinematics, while tracks from Laetoli (Tanzania) show only partial evidence of the characteristic human walking style.
 Plummer et al. (2023) report the discovery of 3.032–2.595 million-years-old fossil material of Paranthropus and Oldowan stone tools from the Nyayanga site (Homa Peninsula, Kenya), expanding known geographic range of both Paranthropus and Oldowan tools, and providing evidence that hominins were already using tools to process soft and hard plant tissues and to butcher animals, including large animals such as hippopotamids, at the Oldowan's inception.
 A study comparing the environments inhabited by Paranthropus boisei and early members of the genus Homo at East Turkana (Kenya) is published by O'Brien, Hebdon & Faith (2023), who report that early Homo co-occurred with bovid assemblages indicative of a broader range of environments than P. boisei, and interpret their findings as supporting the interpretation of P. boisei as an ecological specialist and of early Homo as a generalist.
 A study on the anatomy and phylogenetic affinities of Australopithecus sediba, aiming to determine whether A. sediba and Australopithecus africanus were sister taxa, is published by Mongle, Strait & Grine (2023), who report that they could not reject the hypothesis that A. sediba shared its closest phylogenetic affinities with the genus Homo.
 Evidence from the Simbiro III site (Melka Kunture, Ethiopia), interpreted as indicating that hominins living in this area more than 1.2 million years produced standardized, large tools with sharp cutting edges in a stone-tool workshop, exploiting an accumulation of obsidian cobbles by a meandering river, is presented by Mussi et al. (2023).
 A study on the temporal spacing in the Asian fossil hominin record is published by Roberts et al. (2023), who argue that, in spite of their late persistence, the temporal range of Homo floresiensis and Homo luzonensis is not outside of the expected temporal range for Homo erectus.
 A study on the provenance of the hominin fossils from Trinil (Java, Indonesia) found during the 1891–1908 excavations is published by Pop et al. (2023), who interpret their findings as indicating that the age of the femur which caused Homo erectus to be given its name (Femur I) is uncertain and might be as young as ∼31,000 years, as well as indicating that the taxonomic attribution of this specimen is uncertain, for it might be a bone of an individual belonging to the species Homo erectus, Homo sapiens or a Denisovan.
 A study comparing the evolution of brain shape in humans and other primates is published by Sansalone et al. (2023), who determine that strong covariation between different areas of the brain in Neanderthals and modern humans evolved under higher evolutionary rates than in any other primate.
 A study on an accumulation of crania of large mammals in Level 3 of the Cueva Des-Cubierta (Madrid Region, Spain), apparently processed by Neanderthals, is published by Baquedano et al. (2023), who intepret this accumulation as a likely symbolic practice of Neanderthals.
 Evidence from the Eemian Neumark-Nord 1 site (Germany), interpreted as indicative of systematic targeting and processing of straight-tusked elephants by Neanderthals, is presented by Gaudzinski-Windheuser et al. (2023).
 Bacon et al. (2023) study non-figurative signs associated with images of animals in European caves which were produced by Upper Paleolithic humans, and interpret those signs as an early form of writing used to convey seasonal behavioural information about prey animals.
 Posth et al. (2023) study genomes of hunter-gatherers from western and central Eurasia, spanning between 35,000 and 5,000 years ago, finding that individuals associated with the Gravettian culture across Europe were not a biologically homogeneous population (with some individuals from western Europe having a genetic ancestry profile resembling that of the individuals associated with the Aurignacian culture), reporting that human populations with this ancestry profile survided in southwestern Europe during the Last Glacial Maximum and subsequently re-expanded northeastward, and finding evidence of replacement of human groups in southern Europe around the time of the Last Glacial Maximum.
 Villalba-Mouco et al. (2023) present genome-wide data from a 23,000-year-old Solutrean-associated individual from Cueva del Malalmuerzo (Spain), carrying genetic ancestry interpreted as directly connecting earlier Aurignacian-associated individuals with post-Last Glacial Maximum Magdalenian-associated ancestry in western Europe.
A study of ancient DNA supports or confirms that recent human evolution to resist infection of pathogens also increased inflammatory disease risk in post-Neolithic Europeans over the last 10,000 years, estimating nature, strength, and time of onset of selections.

Rodents

Rodent research
 A study aiming to determine the locomotor behaviour of Diamantomys luederitzi on the basis of its skull and distal humerus morphologies is published by Bento Da Costa, Bardin & Senut (2023), who find evidence for fossorial, terrestrial and arboreal behaviour in different analyses, possibly indicative of a generalist lifestyle and/or intraspecific variation.
 The first description of the endocast of Prospaniomys priscus is presented by Arnaudo & Arnal (2023).

Other euarchontoglires

Miscellaneous euarchontoglires research
 White et al. (2023) present the virtual endocast of a specimen of Niptomomys cf. N. doreenae from the Paleocene of Wyoming (United States), and interpret the anatomy of the brain of this plesiadapiform as consistent with the interpretations of plesiadapiforms as being more olfaction-focused than euprimates.

Laurasiatherians

Artiodactyls

Cetaceans

Cetacean research
 Revision of the eurhinodelphinid cranial material from the Miocene Pietra da Cantoni Formation in the Monferrato area (Piedmont, Italy) is published by Tosetto et al. (2023), who also study the phylogenetic relationships and biogeography of eurhinodelphinids, interpreting their presence in the Mediterranean, Northwest Atlantic and Paratethys as the result of different dispersal events from a Northeast Atlantic center of origin.
 Tanaka, Nagasawa & Oba (2023) describe a skull of a rorqual from the Pliocene-Pleistocene Shinazawa Formation (Japan), identified as aff. Balaenoptera bertae and extending known geographic range of the lineage of B. bertae (formerly known only from the Pliocene Purisima Formation, California, United States).
 Govender & Marx (2023) describe new baleen whale fossils the early Pliocene localities of Saldanha Steel, Milnerton and Langebaanweg (South Africa), including fossils of rorquals belonging to the genera Diunatans and Fragilicetus (previously known only from the North Sea), as well as potentially younger specimens trawled from the seafloor off the Cape Peninsula and south coast of South Africa, including the first pygmy right whale fossil material from Africa reported to date.

Other artiodactyls

Other artiodactyl research
 New information on the anatomy of the skull of Hypisodus minimus is provided by Keppeler et al. (2023).
 Uzunidis et al. (2023) describe fossil material of the Irish elk from the Teixoneres Cave, representing the first record of this species from the late Pleistocene of the eastern Iberian Peninsula, and interpret the fossil record of the Irish elk from the Iberian Peninsula in general to be indicative of rare incursions during the colder periods associated with a drop in sea level making it possible to bypass the Pyrenees, and indicative of differences in diets of Iberian individuals and Northern European individuals.
 Klein et al. (2023) describe partial bony labyrinth of a fetus of Miotragocerus pannoniae from the Miocene locality Höwenegg (Baden-Württemberg, Germany) and compare it with bony labyrinths of adult specimens from the same locality, providing the first information on the growth and ontogenetic variation of this structure in a fossil bovid.
 New fossil material of Neotragocerus is described from the Hemphillian Fort Rock Formation (Oregon, United States) by Martin & Mead (2023), who interpret the anatomy of members of this genus as indicative of boselaphine affinities, retain N. improvisus as a valid species, and consider N. lindgreni to be a nomen dubium.
 A study on the auditory region morphology of extant and extinct members of Hippopotamoidea, and on its implications for putative aquatic affinities of fossil hippopotamoids, is published by Orliac et al. (2023), who interpret their findings as indicative of independent acquisitions of semiaquatic behaviour in hippopotamids and cetaceans.
 Jiménez-Hidalgo & Carbot-Chanona (2023) describe fossil material of an anthracothere belonging to the genus Arretotherium from the Oligocene Iniyoo Local Fauna (Oaxaca) and from the Miocene of Simojovel de Allende (Chiapas), representing the first records of anthracotheres in Mexico reported to date and the southernmost records of Arretotherium in North America during the Oligocene and the early Miocene.

Carnivorans

Carnivoran research
 Morlo et al. (2023) describe amphicyonid fossil material from the Miocene site Napudet (Emunyan Beds; Kenya), including a molar of a large-bodied amphicyonid, interpreted as likely distinct from Cynelos jitu and probably belonging to the genus Myacyon.
 Varajão de Latorre (2023) compares the bacula of five species of borophagine canids with those of extant canids, and interprets their anatomy as indicating that borophagines had long copulatory durations and spontaneous ovulation, similar to those occurring in extant canines.
 A study on the ecomorphology of Ictitherium viverrinum and Hyaenictitherium wongii is published by Kargopoulos et al. (2023), who consider both species to occupy a niche similar to that of extant coyote and to be likely engaged in interspecific competition.
 A study on the elbow joint of Miracinonyx trumani is published by Figueirido et al. (2023), who find that M. trumani had an elbow morphology intermediate to that of extant cougar and extant cheetah, and argue that M. trumani was not as specialized as the cheetah for deploying a predatory behaviour based on fast running.

Chiropterans

Chiropteran research

Eulipotyphlans

Eulipotyphlan research

Perissodactyls

Perissodactyl research
 Description of a new skull of Zaisanamynodon borisovi from the Eocene Aksyir Svita (Kazakhstan) and a new skull of Metamynodon planifrons from the Oligocene Brule Formation (South Dakota, United States), as well as a study on the phylogenetic relationships of amynodontids, is published by Veine-Tonizzo et al. (2023).
 A study on the phylogenetic relationships of rhinoceroses belonging to the group Aceratheriinae is published by Lu, Deng & Pandolfi (2023).
 A skull of a rhinoceros is described from the late Neogene Qin Basin (Shanxi, China) by Shi et al. (2023), who assign this skull to the species Dihoplus ringstroemi, and confirm that D. ringstroemi was a distinct species.
 A study on the phylogenetic relationships of Eurasian Quaternary rhinoceroses is published by Pandolfi (2023).

Other laurasiatherians

Miscellaneous laurasiatherian research
 Revision of the fossil material and the systematic status of Peripantostylops and Othnielmarshia is published by Vera & Mones (2023).
 Systematic revision of the genera Icochilus and Interatherium is published by Fernández, Fernicola & Cerdeño (2023), who consider Icochilus to be a junior synonym of Interatherium, conclude that the genus Interatherium comprises the species I. rodens and I. extensus with wide geographic and temporal distribution, and find that the Santa Cruz Formation cannot be subdivided based on the presence or absence of any species of Interatherium.

Xenarthrans

Cingulatans

Cingulatan research
 New collection of dasypodid osteoderms, identified as belonging to armadillos with strong affinities with taxa from Late Miocene localities in northwestern Argentina, is described from the Miocene Toro Negro Formation (La Rioja Province, Argentina) by Brandoni, Barasoain & González Ruiz (2023).

Pilosans

Pilosan research
 Description of the skull anatomy of Schismotherium fractum is published by Gaudin et al. (2023), who confirm that S. fractum was a taxon distinct from Pelecyodon cristatus.

Other eutherians

Miscellaneous eutherian research

Metatherians

Metatherian research
 Gônet et al. (2023) present a model which can be used to determine posture from humeral parameters in extant mammals, and use it to infer a crouched posture for Peratherium cuvieri.
 A study on the affinities of Estelestes ensis is published by Goin et al. (2023).

Monotremes

Monotreme research

Other mammals

Other mammalian research

General mammalian research

References

2023 in paleontology
Prehistoric mammals